Kerim Memija (born 6 January 1996) is a Bosnian professional footballer who plays as a right back.

Memija started his professional career at Željezničar, before joining Vejle in 2017. In 2019, he was loaned to Hobro.

Club career

Željezničar
Memija came through youth academy of his hometown club Željezničar. He signed his first professional contract in January 2014. He made his professional debut against Slavija on 16 March 2014 at the age of 18. On 17 August 2014, he scored his first professional goal against the same opponent.

Vejle
In January 2017, Memija was transferred to Danish side Vejle for an undisclosed fee. He made his competitive debut for the club in a loss to Skive on 5 March.

Memija was an important piece in Vejle's conquest of Danish 1st Division title, his first trophy with the club, which was sealed on 21 May 2018 and earned them promotion to Danish Superliga.

In September 2019, Memija was sent on a season-long loan to Hobro.

International career
Memija represented Bosnia and Herzegovina on all youth levels. He also served as captain of the under-21 team under coach Vinko Marinović.

Career statistics

Club

Honours
Vejle
1. Division: 2017–18

Zrinjski Mostar
Bosnian Premier League: 2021–22

References

External links

1996 births
Living people
Footballers from Sarajevo
Bosniaks of Bosnia and Herzegovina
Bosnia and Herzegovina Muslims
Association football fullbacks
Bosnia and Herzegovina footballers
Bosnia and Herzegovina youth international footballers
Bosnia and Herzegovina under-21 international footballers
FK Željezničar Sarajevo players
Vejle Boldklub players
Hobro IK players
NK Varaždin players
Premier League of Bosnia and Herzegovina players
Danish 1st Division players
Danish Superliga players
Croatian Football League players
Bosnia and Herzegovina expatriate footballers
Expatriate men's footballers in Denmark
Bosnia and Herzegovina expatriate sportspeople in Denmark
Expatriate footballers in Croatia
Bosnia and Herzegovina expatriate sportspeople in Croatia